Eduardo Mario Gordon Moreau (born 1928) was a Uruguayan basketball player. He competed in the men's tournament at the 1948 Summer Olympics.

References

External links

1928 births
Possibly living people
Uruguayan men's basketball players
Olympic basketball players of Uruguay
Basketball players at the 1948 Summer Olympics
Sportspeople from Montevideo
Uruguayan people of British descent